Train is one of the many municipalities of Germany in the district of Kelheim in Bavaria in Germany.

References

Kelheim (district)